Chon (sometimes stylized as CHON) is an American progressive rock and math rock band from Oceanside, California. Their music is largely instrumental with only a few songs containing vocal performances. The band consists of Mario Camarena (guitar), Erick Hansel (guitar), Esiah Camarena (bass) and Nathan Camarena (drums).

History

Early career
In 2008, they began releasing demos via the internet. In 2010, the band began a brief hiatus, but reunited in 2011 to record two new songs, "O.G." and "Breathe". They returned in 2013 with the release of their debut EP entitled Newborn Sun. In 2014, Chon released their second EP, entitled Woohoo! and embarked on two consecutive nationwide tours with Animals as Leaders.

Debut and departure of Pelisek
In December 2014, Chon signed with the record label Sumerian Records, and announced they would be releasing their debut full-length album the following year. On February 5, 2015, the band announced their debut full length titled Grow would be released in March 2015. On March 5, the band premiered their song Can't Wait from the album via Red Bull. They released the album on March 24. Eight days prior the band embarked on a 27 date tour supporting Circa Survive. On December 16, 2015, Chon announced their first full US headlining tour, titled the Super Chon Bros Tour, with accompanying bands Polyphia and Strawberry Girls. They sold out every single show on the tour. Chon was also an opening band during the Sonic Unrest Tour, featuring headliner Periphery, and bands Sikth and Toothgrinder.

On November 8, 2015, Chon stated via their Twitter feed that they parted ways with Drew Pelisek due to 'artistic differences'. It was also confirmed by Drew on a personal account.

Second album and onward

They recorded their second album Homey with Anthony Crawford on bass. Since Pelisek's departure, Chon has had 3 touring bassists, including original bassist Esiah Camarena, who played bass during the Journey's Unplugged tour. Esiah returned as a full-time member of the band following his attendance on the Robot With Human Hair Vs. Chonzilla tour with Dance Gavin Dance.

On June 7, 2019, Chon released their third full-length self-titled album, under Sumerian Records.

On May 16, 2022, Mario and Erick announced that the band was going on hiatus via their discord server.

Equipment
Chon endorses Ibanez guitars and Overdrive Straps guitar straps. Guitarist Mario Camarena currently plays his signature Ibanez guitar, the MAR10, which is based on an Ibanez AZ series prototype in pink with a white pickguard. Earlier, he used the pink prototype in addition to a white Ibanez AZ prototype that went on to become a regular AZ Prestige model, as well as an Ibanez RG652fx with a custom floral print (including a black version of Yoshi, which Mario uses as his main character in the video game Super Smash Bros.), and an Ibanez S5521Q. He could also often be seen playing a custom Ibanez RG created by Seth Hollander.

Before Chon's "Homey" album, Mario used a Vox AC30 tube amplifier and a Fender Super Sonic but has now switched to a Matchless amplifier. Erick Hansel primarily plays his signature Ibanez guitar, the EH10, which is based on the Ibanez AZ series. Earlier, he used a dark blue Ibanez AZ prototype, an RG652FX with a custom paint dip, an RG321MH (on early albums and performances), and an Ibanez Talman Prestige. Recently, Erick has been seen with either a Vox AC30 or a Matchless amplifier. Chon's early work was known to largely shun the use of effects pedals, but the band has since started experimenting heavily with pedals during the writing process for Homey.

Musical style and influences

In the early days the band were influenced by metal bands such as Necrophagist and post-hardcore band The Fall of Troy, but the band have also listed pianists such as Hiromi Uehara, Tigran Hamasyan, and Alex Argento as influences in their sound. Chon's music was noted for its use of complex harmony with heavy emphasis on extended chords, as well as the odd time signatures and polyrhythms typical of the progressive rock genre. Their second album, Homey, saw the band incorporating elements of trip-hop and electronic music, which can be heard in tracks such as 'Nayhoo.'

Band members
Mario Camarena – guitars (2008–present)
Nathan Camarena – drums (2008–present)
Erick Hansel – guitars (2008–present), vocals (2016–present)
Esiah Camarena – bass (2008–2010, 2016–present)
Former members
Drew Pelisek – bass, vocals (2012–2016)
Touring members
 Brandon Ewing – bass (2016, Super Chon Bros Tour)
 Summer Swee-Singh – keys, string conductor, vocals (2018, Holiday Tour)
Studio members
 Anthony Crawford – bass guitar (2017–present)
 Brian Evans – drums (2015-present)

Timeline

Discography

Studio albums 
Grow (2015, Sumerian Records)
Homey (2017, Sumerian Records)
Chon (2019, Sumerian Records)

EPs 
Newborn Sun (2013, self-released)
Woohoo! (2014, self-released)

Demos 
Chon (2008, self-released)

Singles 
 "Story" (2015, Sumerian Records)
 "Splash" (2015, Sumerian Records)
 "Sleepy Tea" (2017, Sumerian Records)
 "Waterslide" (2017, Sumerian Records)
 "Nayhoo" (featuring Masego & Lophiile) (2017, Sumerian Records)
 "Peace" (2019, Sumerian Records)
 "Petal" (2019, Sumerian Records)
 "Pitch Dark" (2019, Sumerian Records)

References

External links
  (June 21, 2019)

Musical groups established in 2008
Musical groups from San Diego
Musical quartets